Cecilia Marcellina Vega (born January 7, 1977) is an American journalist and news correspondent. Vega worked at the local news affiliate KGO-TV in San Francisco, where she was awarded an Emmy in 2010. The next year, she joined ABC News, first working as a Los Angeles-based correspondent. In 2015, she became the Saturday news anchor for ABC World News Tonight. Vega vacated the position to become the network's senior White House Correspondent, and also hosted Good Morning America.

Early life
Vega graduated in 1995 at Salesian High School in Richmond, California. She graduated from the American University School of Communication in 1999. After graduating, Vega reported for the San Francisco Chronicle, covering then-Mayor Gavin Newsom's administration. Her reporting received accolades from the California Newspaper Publishers Association, the East Bay Press Club, and the Hearst Corporation.

Career

KGO-TV
For three years, Vega reported for the ABC network affiliate station KGO-TV in San Francisco, covering numerous stories. In 2010, Vega won a Northern California Emmy Award for the Best Daytime Newscast in a Large Market.

ABC News
Vega joined ABC News in 2011 as a Los Angeles-based correspondent. In 2012, Vega covered the elections and second inauguration of President Barack Obama. During her time as a correspondent, Vega covered numerous assignments, including the Fukushima power plant disaster, the appointment of Pope Francis, the 2014 Ebola epidemic in the United States, the Sony computer hacking, the sexual assault allegations against Bill Cosby, and the 2016 Summer Olympics.

On March 2, 2015, she became the anchor for the Saturday edition of World News Tonight, with Tom Llamas anchoring the Sunday edition. In January 2017, Llamas was named the full-time weekend anchor of World News Tonight, while Vega was moved to become the senior White House Correspondent.

On October 1, 2018, during a press conference about the United States–Mexico–Canada Agreement, U.S. President Donald Trump called on her to ask him questions. He then joked at Vega's surprised reaction, stating: "I know you're not thinking. You never do." Vega brushed aside the remark, and asked Trump about the FBI investigation into then-Supreme Court nominee Brett Kavanaugh. Trump declined to answer, stating the question was unrelated to the trade deal. Vega later tweeted: "A news conference means you get to ask whatever question you want to ask. #FirstAmendment."

In January 2021, Vega was named the chief White House Correspondent for ABC News, succeeding Jonathan Karl.

CBS News
On January 19, 2023, it was reported that Vega would be joining CBS News as a correspondent for 60 Minutes.

Personal life
She is married to California Highway Patrol officer Ricardo Jiménez.

References

1977 births
21st-century American women
Living people
ABC News personalities
American television reporters and correspondents
American University School of Communication alumni
American women television journalists
CBS News people
Hispanic and Latino American women journalists
60 Minutes correspondents